Passport Quiz is a Scottish Gameshow created by Bryan Burnett in which three pairs of contestants competed to win cash and prizes. The programme ran between 1998 and 2002 and was produced by Scottish Television.

History
Bryan Burnett was the Co-host of Scottish Passport, which started in 1994. In 1998 Burnett came up with the idea for the show, in which contestants would use their knowledge of world geography when answering questions to win prizes.

Gameplay

Broadcast 
Five series were broadcast between 1998 and 2002, on Scottish Television and Grampian Television.

 Series 1 : 25 Episodes (1998)
 Series 2 : 26 Episodes (1999)
 Series 3 : 50 Episodes (2000-2001)
 Series 4 : 25 Episodes (2002)
 Series 5 : 25 Episodes (2002)

External links
Passport Quiz  at BFI

References

1998 British television series debuts
2003 British television series endings
1990s British game shows
2000s British game shows
ITV game shows
Scottish television shows
Television shows produced by Scottish Television
English-language television shows